Vilhjálmur Vilmundarson (17 April 1929 - 30 March 2020) was an Icelandic athlete. He competed in the men's shot put at the 1948 Summer Olympics.

References

External links
 

1929 births
2020 deaths
Athletes (track and field) at the 1948 Summer Olympics
Icelandic male shot putters
Olympic athletes of Iceland
Place of birth missing